Emma Trott (born 24 December 1989) is a retired English racing cyclist from Cheshunt, currently based in Christchurch, New Zealand. She rode for the Dutch women's professional team Dolmans-Boels from the 2012 to the 2014 season.

On 10 May 2014, Trott announced she would retire from road racing after the final stage of the Friends Life Women's Tour the following day. She became a personal trainer and cycling coach in New Zealand before returning to the UK to join the coaching team for British Cycling's women's academy programme from November 2018.

She is the older sister of fellow cyclist and Olympic Gold medalist Laura Kenny,

Palmarès

2004
3rd British National Circuit Race Championships – under 16
2006
1st British National Road Race Championships – Junior
2007
3rd Individual Pursuit, British National Track Championships – Junior
3rd British National Road Race Championships – Junior

2008 – Team Halfords Bikehut 2008 season
3rd U23 British National Road Race Championships
2nd Individual Pursuit, British National Track Championships
3rd RTTC National 10 Mile Time Trial Championships

2009
6th Overall Tour de Feminin – O cenu Ceskeho Svycarska
1st Stage 2

2010
1st Stage 3 (ITT) Gracia–Orlová

2011
1st Scratch Race, European Track Championships – under 23

2013 – 2013 Boels–Dolmans season

2014 – 2014 Boels–Dolmans season

References

External links
Emma Trott profile on Dolmans-Boels website

1989 births
Living people
English female cyclists
Cyclists at the 2010 Commonwealth Games
People from Cheshunt
Lesbian sportswomen
LGBT cyclists
English LGBT sportspeople
New Zealand LGBT sportspeople
English track cyclists
Sportspeople from Welwyn Garden City
Commonwealth Games competitors for England
21st-century New Zealand women
English emigrants to New Zealand